Mandurah is the central suburb of the city of Mandurah in Western Australia's Peel region. At the 2016 census, it had a population of 7,837.

References

Suburbs of Mandurah